Donna G. Nelson (born 1943) is an American Republican politician who served in the Oregon House of Representatives from 2001 until 2009, representing Yamhill County. She previously served as a board member of Evergreen International Aviation.

References

Living people
1943 births
Republican Party members of the Oregon House of Representatives
People from McMinnville, Oregon
Women state legislators in Oregon
People from Paducah, Texas
21st-century American politicians
21st-century American women politicians